Joseph Walkup, a member of the Democratic Party, was the fifth Lieutenant Governor of California from 1858 to 1860.

Biography
Walkup was born in Piqua, Ohio on December 25, 1819.  He was educated locally, and after he was orphaned at age 17 he began a career as a carpenter.  He worked in Ohio, and eventually made his way to New Orleans, which he expanded his trade to include shipbuilding and steamboat construction.

In 1849 Walkup traveled to California as part of the influx caused by the gold rush.  Walkup settled in Auburn, California, where he became successful as a partner in a mercantile business.  His success enabled him to branch out to other ventures, including ownership or operation of several farms.

Walkup was head of the committee that formed and established Placer County.

A Democrat in politics, Walkup represented Placer County in the California Senate from 1852 to 1857.  In 1857 he was elected Lieutenant Governor, and he served one term, 1858 to 1860.  In 1860 Walkup was an unsuccessful candidate for the Democratic nomination for Governor of California. In 1858 while serving as Lieutenant Governor, Walkup served as the warden of San Quinten State Prison.

After leaving office Walkup remained active in politics as a delegate to numerous party conventions, and he became owner and editor of the Placer Herald newspaper.

Walkup died in Placer on October 15, 1873, after suffering a stroke while working in his office at the Herald.  He was buried at Old Auburn Cemetery in Auburn.

External links
Chronology of California's Lieutenant Governors

1798 births
1873 deaths
People from Auburn, California
Democratic Party California state senators
Lieutenant Governors of California
Burials in California
19th-century American politicians